Fotuhaa is an island in Lifuka district, in the Haapai islands of Tonga. As of 2020, the population is estimated at approximately 100-150 and an area of 1.14 km2.

See also 
 List of cities in Tonga

References 

Islands of Tonga
Haapai